Massachusetts Senate's 2nd Middlesex district in the United States is one of 40 legislative districts of the Massachusetts Senate. It covers portions of Middlesex county. Democrat Pat Jehlen of Somerville has represented the district since 2015. She is running for re-election in 2020, and has been endorsed by the Massachusetts Women's Political Caucus.

Locales represented
The district includes the following localities:
 northwest Cambridge 
 Medford
 Somerville
 Winchester

The current district geographic boundary overlaps with those of the Massachusetts House of Representatives' 23rd Middlesex, 24th Middlesex, 25th Middlesex, 26th Middlesex, 27th Middlesex, 29th Middlesex, 31st Middlesex, 34th Middlesex, and 35th Middlesex districts.

Former locales
The district previously covered the following:
 Belmont, circa 1860s
 Malden, circa 1860s
 Waltham, circa 1860s
 Watertown, circa 1860s
 West Cambridge (Arlington), circa 1860s

Senators 
 J.M.S. Williams, circa 1859 
 Thorndike Spalding
 William Eustis Russell
 George Carrick
 Charles Thomas Cavanagh, circa 1935 
 Edward M. Rowe, circa 1945 
 Daniel Francis O'Brien, circa 1953
 Francis X. McCann, circa 1957-1969 
 Denis L. McKenna, circa 1979 
 Salvatore R. "Sal" Albano, 1985-1991 
 Charles Edward Shannon, Jr., circa 1993-2002 
 Patricia D. Jehlen, 2015-current

Images
Portraits of legislators

See also
 List of Massachusetts Senate elections
 List of Massachusetts General Courts
 List of former districts of the Massachusetts Senate
 Other Middlesex County districts of the Massachusett Senate: 1st, 3rd, 4th, 5th; 1st Essex and Middlesex; 2nd Essex and Middlesex; 1st Middlesex and Norfolk, 2nd Middlesex and Norfolk; Middlesex and Suffolk; Middlesex and Worcester; Norfolk, Bristol and Middlesex; 1st Suffolk and Middlesex; 2nd Suffolk and Middlesex
 Middlesex County districts of the Massachusetts House of Representatives: 1st, 2nd, 3rd, 4th, 5th, 6th, 7th, 8th, 9th, 10th, 11th, 12th, 13th, 14th, 15th, 16th, 17th, 18th, 19th, 20th, 21st, 22nd, 23rd, 24th, 25th, 26th, 27th, 28th, 29th, 30th, 31st, 32nd, 33rd, 34th, 35th, 36th, 37th

References

External links
 Ballotpedia
  (State Senate district information based on U.S. Census Bureau's American Community Survey).

Senate
Government of Middlesex County, Massachusetts
Massachusetts Senate